Gary McSheffrey (born 13 August 1982) is an English football manager and former player who was most recently manager of  club Doncaster Rovers.

As a player he was a striker and left winger who made more than 450 appearances in the Football League and Premier League, including 247 for Coventry City, where he became the youngest player ever to play in the Premier League. He went on to play for Stockport County, Luton Town, Birmingham City, Nottingham Forest, and Leeds United before returning to Coventry in 2010. Released in September 2013, he signed for Chesterfield later that month. In January 2014, he signed for Scunthorpe United on a free transfer until the end of the 2013–14 season before moving on to Doncaster Rovers, Eastleigh, Grimsby Town, and Frickley Athletic. He scored more than 100 league goals during his career. McSheffrey played internationally for England at under-20 level.

After a short spell as caretaker manager of Doncaster, he was appointed manager in December 2021.

Club career

Coventry City
McSheffrey was born in Coventry, and began his football career at home town club Coventry City. When he made his first-team debut against local rivals Aston Villa at the age of 16 years and 198 days on 27 February 1999, a game that Coventry won 4–1, he became the youngest player ever to play in the Premier League. He held the record for over four years until Aaron Lennon made his Leeds United debut at a younger age in August 2003. During his time at Coventry he spent loan spells at Stockport County, Luton Town earlier in the 2004–05 season helping them achieve promotion to the Championship, and Swedish side IK Brage. He represented England at under-18 and under-20 levels.

Playing primarily on the left wing in the 2005–06 season, McSheffrey ended up among the top scorers in the Football League Championship with 15 league goals. It was form like this that brought him to the attention of local rivals Birmingham City during the summer of 2006. After weeks of bidding, Coventry accepted an offer valued at £4 million. This has since been estimated at £2.3m cash with a further £1.3m depending on promotion and appearances. The deal was completed on 16 August 2006, and McSheffrey became a Birmingham City player three days after his 24th birthday.

Birmingham City
McSheffrey scored his first hat-trick for his new club in a league match against Preston North End on 9 December 2006. He was part of the 2006–07 promotion-winning side, returning to the Premier League after just one season in the Championship. McSheffrey was also their top scorer with 16 goals, of which 13 were scored in the league. His penalty in Birmingham's 3–2 win against Tottenham Hotspur at White Hart Lane on 2 December 2007 was his first goal in the Premier League. McSheffrey found his time limited during the 2008–09 season; he helped the side clinch promotion back to the Premier League by winning four out of six league appearances he made. In March 2009, he joined Nottingham Forest on loan for what was reported as an initial month. and then to have returned to Birmingham because he needed surgery on a persistent knee problem, but manager Alex McLeish confirmed that the loan was in fact for two months. Told in August 2009 that he was free to find another club, and frustrated by lack of opportunity, McSheffrey made just one start and four substitute appearances in the 2009–10 Premier League.

Leeds United (loan)
On 29 January 2010, McSheffrey joined Leeds United of Football League One on loan for the remainder of the season. He made his debut the following day, producing a man-of-the-match performance on the left wing in Leeds' 2–0 League home win against Colchester United. In an interview after the game McSheffrey said "there'd be no better club to be with at Championship level" should Leeds succeed in gaining promotion.

Ineligible for an FA Cup replay against Tottenham Hotspur, McSheffrey returned to the starting line-up for the 2–2 draw with Hartlepool United. He started on the left wing for Leeds against Carlisle United in the Football League Trophy Northern Final second leg. Leeds won the game 3–2, but ended up losing the tie after losing the penalty shootout 6–5, with McSheffrey converting one of the penalties for Leeds.

He scored his first and only goal for Leeds against Walsall after his mis-hit cross eluded goalkeeper Clayton Ince, but Walsall won 2–1 to inflict Leeds' first home defeat in more than a year. McSheffrey was dropped to the bench against Oldham Athletic and replaced in the starting line-up by Aidan White, but after White suffered an injury McSheffrey returned to Leeds' starting line-up against Huddersfield Town. McSheffrey earned promotion with Leeds to the Championship, after finishing as runners up in League One.

Return to Coventry City
In May 2010, Birmingham City announced that McSheffrey was one of five players to be released when their contracts expired at the end of June. He agreed to return to Championship club Coventry City, where he agreed a one-year deal, with the option of a further year, to begin on 1 July 2010.

His return to Coventry was a largely disappointing spell in his career, despite being a regular starter, fans felt that his best years were past him. McSheffrey was one of eight players told in June 2013 that they did not feature in manager Steven Pressley's future plans, and one of five who had to train on their own during pre-season. On 3 September, his contract was cancelled.

Chesterfield
Ten days later, he signed a four-month contract with League Two club Chesterfield.

Scunthorpe United
On 14 January 2014, McSheffrey signed for Scunthorpe United until the end of the 2013–14 season. McSheffrey made his United debut on 25 January in a 3–3 draw away to Dagenham & Redbridge, and his home debut two days later in a goalless draw with Fleetwood. His first goal for the club came from a  free kick in a 2–1 win against Walsall on 30 August. He played 37 times for United in the league that season, scoring four goals, as they finished 16th behind Oldham Athletic by one point.

Doncaster Rovers
On 23 March 2016, McSheffrey signed for fellow League One club Doncaster Rovers on loan until the end of the season.

Eastleigh
McSheffrey joined National League club Eastleigh on 7 September 2017 on a deal until January 2018. He scored twice from 11 league appearances before his contract was cancelled by mutual consent for family reasons in late November.

Grimsby Town
McSheffrey joined League Two club Grimsby Town as a free agent on 15 March 2018 until the end of the season. He was released at the end of the season.

Coaching career
McSheffrey played a one-match trial for Boston United in their Lincolnshire Senior Cup defeat against Lincoln United in July 2018, before joining the coaching staff at Doncaster Rovers' Academy as professional development phase coach working with the under-18 team. Alongside his coaching role, he played a few matches for Northern Premier League East side Frickley Athletic early in the 2018–19 season, and made his debut for Northern Counties East League club Rossington Main in October 2020.

On 2 December 2021, McSheffrey was appointed caretaker manager of Doncaster Rovers following the sacking of manager Richie Wellens with the club 23rd in the table. After four matches in charge, he was appointed manager on a permanent basis.

On 17 October 2022, McSheffrey was sacked by Doncaster Rovers.

Personal life
McSheffrey has coached children in the Coventry area via the Soccer Rockz football coaching programme, in association with Coventry City Football Club (CCFC).

A former pupil of Bishop Ullathorne School, McSheffrey is a Roman Catholic.

Career statistics

Managerial statistics

Honours

As a player
Luton Town
League One: 2004–05

Birmingham City
Championship second-place promotion: 2006–07
Championship second-place promotion: 2008–09

Leeds United
League One second-place promotion: 2009–10

Scunthorpe United
League Two second-place promotion: 2013–14

Doncaster Rovers
EFL League Two third-place promotion: 2016–17

Individual
PFA Team of the Year: 2006–07 Football League Championship

References

External links

1982 births
Living people
Footballers from Coventry
English Roman Catholics
English footballers
England youth international footballers
Association football forwards
Association football wingers
Coventry City F.C. players
IK Brage players
Stockport County F.C. players
Luton Town F.C. players
Birmingham City F.C. players
Nottingham Forest F.C. players
Leeds United F.C. players
Chesterfield F.C. players
Scunthorpe United F.C. players
Doncaster Rovers F.C. players
Eastleigh F.C. players
Grimsby Town F.C. players
Frickley Athletic F.C. players
Rossington Main F.C. players
Premier League players
English Football League players
Superettan players
National League (English football) players
Northern Premier League players
English expatriate footballers
Expatriate footballers in Sweden
Association football coaches
English football managers
Doncaster Rovers F.C. non-playing staff
Doncaster Rovers F.C. managers
English Football League managers